Jack Mingo (born 1952) is an American author, journalist and beekeeper. He has written Bees Make the Best Pets, The Juicy Parts, and The Couch Potato Handbook. He and a small group of media hoaxers trademarked and popularized the term couch potato. He has written for The New York Times, The Washington Post, and Reader's Digest. He and Erin Barrett were co-founders and co-writers of the Ask Jeeves series of trivia books, which published selected "questions as they flowed, unedited, into the well-known Web site".

Personal life
Mingo was born to Vera and Glen Mingo in Wausau, Wisconsin. He lives in Alameda, California. He has a daughter (Elana) from a former marriage and three grandsons, Acton, Oak, and Elm.

Works and publications
 Bees Make the Best Pets (2013)  
 Ben Franklin's Guide to Wealth (2004) 
 The Juicy Parts (1996) 
 How the Cadillac Got Its Fins (1995)

With Erin Barrett
 Cause of Death: A Perfect Little Guide to What Kills Us (2009) 
 Random Kinds Of Factness: 1001 (or So) Absolutely True Tidbits About (Mostly) Everything (2005) 
 Just Curious about Science, Jeeves (2003) 
 It Takes a Certain Type to be a Writer: Facts from the World of Writing and Publishing (2003) 
 Just Curious About History, Jeeves (2002)  
 Just Curious About Animals and Nature, Jeeves (2002) 
 Doctors Killed George Washington: Hundreds of Fascinating Facts from the World of Medicine (2002) 
 Not Another Apple for the Teacher: Hundreds of Fascinating Facts from the World of Education (2002) 
 Just Curious, Jeeves: What Are the 1001 Most Intriguing Questions Asked on the Internet? (2000)

With Warren Dotz
 Firecrackers!: An Eye-Popping Collection of Chinese Firework Art (2008) 
 Firecrackers: The Art and History (2000)

References

1953 births
American male writers
Living people
People from Alameda, California